José Manuel "Manel" Martínez Bel (born 25 March 1992) is a Spanish footballer who plays for Surkhon Termez as a forward.

Club career
Born in Cabrera de Mar, Barcelona, Catalonia, Manel finished his formation with UE Cornellà. He made his senior debut for the club in 2011, and subsequently moved to CD Masnou.

In 2012, after a short period at CE Europa, Manel moved abroad for the first time in his career, joining Virginia Commonwealth University's team VCU Rams while studying. On 17 June 2013, he signed for National Premier Soccer League club RVA FC, being crowned champions with the side.

In January 2015 Manel returned to his homeland, signing for CE Sabadell FC B still in the fourth division. He renewed his contract until 2017 on 16 June, and after scoring 13 goals in only 18 matches, was promoted to the main squad on 31 December; he also extended his contract for a further season.

On 22 July 2016 Manel joined Segunda División side Girona FC, but was loaned to UE Llagostera in the third tier on 18 August, for one year. After scoring 14 goals for the latter he joined Lorca FC on loan the following 15 May, and helped the club in the play-offs as it achieved promotion to the second division for the first time ever.

Manel made his professional debut on 18 August 2017, starting in a 2–0 home win against Cultural y Deportiva Leonesa. The following 11 January he cut ties with the club, returning to Girona and being immediately assigned to the reserves in the third division.

On 17 July 2018, Manel signed for Real Murcia still in the third tier. In the following season, Manel joined Marbella FC.

Personal life
Manel is the son of former FC Barcelona defender Manolo.

Honours
RVA FC
National Premier Soccer League: 2013

References

External links

1992 births
Living people
People from Selva
Sportspeople from the Province of Girona
Spanish footballers
Footballers from Catalonia
Association football forwards
Segunda División players
Primera Federación players
Segunda División B players
Tercera División players
CF Damm players
UE Cornellà players
CD Masnou players
CE Europa footballers
CE Sabadell FC B players
CE Sabadell FC footballers
CF Peralada players
UE Costa Brava players
Lorca FC players
Real Murcia players
Marbella FC players
CD Atlético Baleares footballers
VCU Rams men's soccer players
National Premier Soccer League players
RVA FC players
Spanish expatriate footballers
Spanish expatriate sportspeople in the United States
Expatriate soccer players in the United States